Terry and the Gunrunners is a book by New Zealand authors Bob Kerr and Stephen Ballantyne.

The authors created the comic book Terry and the Gunrunners in 1982 as part of a series that also included Terry and the Yodelling Bull (1986) and Terry and the Last Moa (1991).

The comic was a considerable local success, selling over 20,000 copies and eventually the character achieved a cult status as a retro-icon with imagery being used by graphic T-shirt companies. The book was reissued in 2015 to tie in with the new version of the TV series.

Plot

The story is about Terry Teo the skateboarding schoolboy who is the hero of the story. Along with his martial arts expert sister Polly, he takes on the notorious gunrunner Ray Vegas and his henchmen, Bluey and Curly. The bright colours and crazy sets help to recreate the story's comic book origins.

Adaptations
In 1985 it was made into a popular children's television series starring Adrian Bell as Terry Teo and including many stars such as; Michael Bentine (from the Goons), ex-NZ Prime Minister Rob Muldoon, and comedian Billy T. James amongst others.  The theme song was composed by Don McGlashan. 

On 11 October 2013 it was announced that NZ On Air had funded a new series to be made by Semi-Professional Pictures for TV2.

In 2016, Gerard Johnstone released Terry Teo, a reboot of Terry and the Gunrunners.

References 

 Bob Kerr's bio on the NZ Book Council website
 Note in "Comics in Australia and New Zealand", viewable on Google Books
 TV series entry on BFI

New Zealand comics titles
Comics adapted into television series
Television shows based on comics
New Zealand children's television series
1980s New Zealand television series
1985 New Zealand television series debuts